Home is the début solo-album by the British singer Terry Hall. It was released in 1994 on the Anxious label.

Although Hall had been in the music industry for fifteen years at the time of release, Home was his first album credited to him alone; previously Hall had recorded and fronted The Specials, Fun Boy Three, The Colourfield, Terry, Blair & Anouchka and Vegas.

The album was critically acclaimed when released but was not a commercial success, peaking at number ninety-five on the UK Albums Chart. It includes the singles "Forever J", "Sense" and the Rainbows EP which featured "Chasing a Rainbow". In 1995 the album was re-released with a different picture sleeve and had the inclusion of the track "Chasing a Rainbow" co-written by and featuring Damon Albarn. Both editions of the album have since been deleted and are difficult to purchase.

Hall wrote the majority of the album with guitarist Craig Gannon and wrote in collaboration with several acclaimed musicians namely Ian Broudie of The Lightning Seeds, Andy Partridge of XTC, Nick Heyward of Haircut One Hundred and Damon Albarn of Blur on "Chasing a Rainbow", which was an extra track on the 1995 re-issue of the album. The album was produced by Ian Broudie, with whom Hall had previously worked during his time with The Colourfield and on Broudie's 1992 Lightning Seeds album Sense. Hall and Broudie have written and recorded together on the majority of Broudie's albums.

Track listing
 "Forever J" (Terry Hall, Craig Gannon) – 4:03
 "You" (Hall, Ian Broudie) – 3:50
 "Sense" (Hall, Broudie) – 3:39
 "I Drew a Lemon" (Hall, Andy Partridge) – 3:36
 "Moon on Your Dress" (Hall, Partridge) – 3:45
 "No No No" (Hall, Gannon) – 4:04
 "What's Wrong with Me" (Hall, Nick Heyward) – 4:08
 "Grief Disguised as Joy" (Hall, Gannon) – 4:10
 "First Attack of Love" (Hall, Gannon) – 3:41
 "I Don't Got You" (Hall, Gannon) – 3:41
1995 edition extra track
"Chasing a Rainbow" (Hall, Damon Albarn) – 3:09

Personnel

Musicians
 Terry Hall – vocals
 Les Pattinson – bass 
 Chris Sharrock – drums 
 Craig Gannon – guitar 
 Simon Rogers – keyboards, effects
 Andy Redhead – percussion 
 Clive Layton – piano, organ
 Angie Pollock – vocals
 Belinda Leith – vocals
 Sam Obernik – vocals
 Ian Broudie – guitar on "You" and "Sense"
 Damon Albarn – featured performer on "Chasing a Rainbow"

Technical
 Ian Broudie – producer
 Cenzo Townshend – engineer
 Ian McFarlane – engineering assistant
 Bob Kraushaar - remixing on "Forever J" and "Sense"
 Alison Tutton – design
 Terry Hall – sleeve concept
 Juergen Teller – sleeve photography 
 Tom Sheehan – photography

Chart positions
Album

Singles

References

Terry Hall (singer) albums
1994 debut albums
Albums produced by Ian Broudie